This is a list of mayors, presidents and chairmen of the City of Malvern, a former local government area in  Melbourne, Victoria, Australia and its precedents. It existed from 1856 until 1994 when it merged with the City of Prahran to form the new City of Stonnington.

Council name

Gardiner Road Board chairmen (1856–1870)

Gardiner Shire presidents (1871–1877)

Malvern Shire presidents (1877–1900)

Malvern City mayors (1900–1994)

Stonnington City mayors (from 1996)
List of Mayors of Stonnington

See also
Stonnington City Centre (formerly the Malvern Town Hall)
List of mayors of Prahran

References
Gardiner and Malvern Chairmen, Mayors and Councillors

Malvern
Mayors Malvern